The Captaincy of São Vicente (1534–1709) was a land grant and colonial administration in the far southern part of the colonial Portuguese Empire in Colonial Brazil.

History
In 1534 King John III of Portugal granted the Captaincy to Martim Afonso de Sousa, a Portuguese admiral.  Sousa had founded the first two permanent Portuguese settlements in Brazil in 1532: São Vicente (near the present port of Santos) and  Piratininga (later to become São Paulo).  

Martim Afonso received two tracts of land:

 one centered on the settlement of São Vicente, extending along the coastline from Cananeia to Bertioga (within present-day São Paulo state)
 the other extended from Parati to Cabo Frio (within present-day  Rio de Janeiro state).

Although divided into two lots - separated by the Captaincy of Santo Amaro - together these territories formed the Captaincy of São Vicente.

In 1681 the São Paulo settlement succeeded São Vicente as the capital of the captaincy, and the original name of the latter gradually fell into disuse.

São Vicente became the only captaincy to flourish in southern Portuguese colony of Brazil. It ultimately gave rise to São Paulo state and provided the base for the Bandeirantes to expand Portuguese America to the west of the Tordesilhas Line.

Territorial evolution of the Captaincy of São Vicente (1534–1709)
The Captaincy of São Vicente in Southern Brazil:

See also

Captaincy of São Paulo

References

Cited texts
 Lockhart, J.(1983), Early Latin America: A History of Colonial Spanish America and Brazil. Cambridge University Press 
 Baptista, S.(2008) Chaptory 4: Historical Context Forest Recovery and Just Sustainability in the Florianopolis City-region UMI 3349866

 Colonial History of Sao Paulo

External links
 Pedro Taques de Almeida Paes Leme História da Capitania de São Paulo "History of the Captaincy of São Paulo"

Sao Vicente
History of São Paulo (state)
States and territories established in 1534
States and territories disestablished in 1709
Portuguese colonization of the Americas
17th century in Brazil
18th century in Brazil
1630s in Brazil
1640s in Brazil
1650s in Brazil
1690s in Brazil
1534 establishments in Brazil